Duke of Paducah is a nickname that may refer to:
Irvin S. Cobb, nicknamed "Duke of Paducah"
Benjamin Francis Ford, known as The Duke of Paducah
William S. Heatly, nicknamed "Duke of Paducah"

See also
Paducah, Kentucky
Paducah, Texas